Julian Smith may refer to:
Julian C. Smith (1885–1975), United States Marine Corps general
Julian Cleveland Smith (1878–1939), American-Canadian engineer and business executive
Julian Sinclair Smith (1920–1993), American electrical engineer and television executive
Julian Smith (politician) (born 1971), British MP and Former Northern Ireland Secretary
Julian Smith (saxophonist) (born 1969), contestant on the third series of Britain's Got Talent
Julian Smith (author) (born 1972), American author
Julian Smith (footballer) (born 1967), Bahamian soccer defender
Julian Smith (photographer), British-born Australian surgeon and Pictorialist photographer 
Julian Smith, British businessman, co-founder of Opes Prime
Julian Smith (publisher) (born 1943), New Zealand businessperson

See also
Julian Horn-Smith (born 1948), British businessman